Tachys micros is a species of ground beetle in the Trechinae subfamily.

References

Beetles described in 1828
Trechinae